Salmanabad (also Romanized as Salmānābād; also known as Salmān Kandī) is a village in Qeshlaq-e Shomali Rural District, in the Central District of Parsabad County, Ardabil Province, Iran. At the 2006 census, its population was 51, in 16 families.

References 

Towns and villages in Parsabad County